Jackie Coogan was an American actor whose career spanned decades, and included numerous feature films and television series. The child of vaudeville performers, Coogan began his career as a child actor, and had his first major role in Charlie Chaplin's The Kid (1921). He went on to appear in numerous films throughout his childhood and adolescence, and had a career as a television actor in his later life, appearing as Uncle Fester on The Addams Family (1964–1966), as well as numerous other guest-starring roles. Coogan's final film credit was the slasher film The Prey (1984), which was filmed several years prior and released shortly after his death in 1984.

Film

Television

References

Sources

External links

American filmographies
Male actor filmographies